Akira Hirose is an engineer at the University of Tokyo, Japan. He was named a Fellow of the Institute of Electrical and Electronics Engineers in 2013 for his contributions to the theory and radar applications of complex-valued neural networks.

References

Fellow Members of the IEEE
Living people
Year of birth missing (living people)
Place of birth missing (living people)
Academic staff of the University of Tokyo
21st-century Japanese engineers